This is a list of shopping malls in Singapore, sorted along their districts. As of August 2020, there are 171 malls on this list.

Some listed shopping malls here are also inclusive as a mixed-use development and or part of an neighbourhood plaza.

Central

 100 AM
 313@Somerset
 Aperia
 Balestier Hill Shopping Centre
 Bugis Cube
 Bugis Junction
 Bugis+
 Capitol Piazza
 Cathay Cineleisure Orchard
 Clarke Quay Central
 The Centrepoint
 City Square Mall
 City Gate Mall
 CityLink Mall
 Duo
 Far East Plaza
 Funan
 Great World City
 HDB Hub
 Holland Village Shopping Mall
 ION Orchard
 Junction 8
 Knightsbridge
 Liat Towers
 Lucky Plaza
 Marina Bay Sands
 The Shoppes at Marina Bay Sands
 Marina Bay Link Mall
 Marina Square
 Millenia Walk
 Mustafa Shopping Centre
 Ngee Ann City
 Orchard Central
 Orchard Gateway
 Orchard Plaza
 Midpoint Orchard
 Palais Renaissance
 People's Park Centre
 People's Park Complex
 Plaza Singapura
 PoMo
 Raffles City
 Scotts Square
 Shaw House and Centre
 Sim Lim Square
 Singapore Shopping Centre
 The South Beach
 Square 2
 Sunshine Plaza
 Suntec City
 Tanglin Mall
 Tanjong Pagar Centre
 Tekka Centre
 The Adelphi
 The Paragon
 Tiong Bahru Plaza
 The Poiz
 Thomson Plaza
 United Square
 Thomson V
 Velocity@Novena Square
 Wheelock Place
 Wisma Atria
 Zhongshan Mall

East

 Bedok Mall
 Century Square
 Our Tampines Hub
 Changi City Point
 Downtown East
 Djitsun Mall Bedok
 Eastpoint Mall
 Jewel Changi Airport
 KINEX (formerly OneKM)
 Katong Shopping Centre
 Katong Square
 Kallang Wave Mall
 Leisure Park Kallang
 i12 Katong
 Parkway Parade
 Paya Lebar Square
 Paya Lebar Quarter (PLQ)
 Roxy Square
 Singpost Centre
 Tampines 1
 Tampines Mall
 White Sands
 City Plaza
 Elias Mall
 Loyang Point

North

 888 Plaza
 Admiralty Place
 AMK Hub
 Canberra Plaza
 Causeway Point
 Woodlands Civic Centre
 Broadway Plaza
 Djitsun Mall
 Jubilee Square
 Junction 8
 Junction Nine
 Marsiling Mall
 Northpoint City
 Sembawang Shopping Centre
 Sun Plaza
 Vista Point
 Wisteria Mall
 Woodlands Mart
 Woodlands North Plaza

North East

 Waterway Point
 Compass One
 Hougang Mall
 Heartland Mall
 NEX
 Buangkok Square
 Greenwich V
 Hougang 1
 Hougang Green Shopping Mall
 Hougang Rivercourt
 myVillage At Serangoon Garden
 Northshore Plaza
 Oasis Terraces
 Punggol Plaza
 Rivervale Mall
 Rivervale Plaza
 The Seletar Mall
 Upper Serangoon Shopping Centre

North West

 Beauty World Centre
 Beauty World Plaza
 Bukit Panjang Plaza
 Bukit Timah Plaza
 Fajar Shopping Centre
 Greenridge Shopping Centre
 Hillion Mall
 HillV2
 Junction 10
 Keat Hong Shopping Centre
 Limbang Shopping Centre
 Lot One
 Rail Mall
 Sunshine Place
 Teck Whye Shopping Centre
 West Mall
 Yew Tee Point
 Yew Tee Square

South
 VivoCity
 HarbourFront Centre
 Alexandra Retail Centre

West

 321 Clementi
 The Clementi Mall
 IMM
 JCube
 Jem
 Westgate
 Jurong Point
 Pioneer Mall
The Star Vista
 Alexandra Central
 Anchorpoint
 OD Mall
 Boon Lay Shopping Centre
 Grantral Mall
 Fairprice Hub
 Gek Poh Shopping Centre
 Rochester Mall
 Taman Jurong Shopping Centre
 West Coast Plaza
 Queensway Shopping Centre

References

Singapore
Food court in Singapore
Shopping malls